HMS Saltburn was a  built for the Royal Navy during World War I. Named after the town of Saltburn-by-the-Sea in North Yorkshire, she was not completed until after the end of the war. The ship saw no active service during World War II as she spent the war as a training ship. Saltburn was sold for scrap in 1946, but was wrecked while under tow.

Saltburn was built by Murdoch and Murray of Port Glasgow and her keel was laid down on 29 January 1918. She was launched on 9 October 1918 and completed on 31 December 1918. The ship was armed with a QF  gun forward and a QF 12-pounder anti-aircraft gun aft.

In the 1930s, Saltburn was the RN Signal School's tender. A prototype Type 79X radar was installed in October 1936 and its antennas were strung between the ship's masts.

After the war, Saltburn ran aground off Horse Sand Fort on 26 October 1945 and was declared a constructive total loss. She was sold for scrap on 16 November 1946, but was wrecked off Hartland Point the following month while under tow.

Notes

References

External links 
Chronologies of War Service of Royal Navy Warships
Clydebuilt Database

Hunt-class minesweepers (1916)
1918 ships
Maritime incidents in October 1945
Maritime incidents in 1946